Polaski is a Polish language habitational surname and a variant of Pułaski for someone from a place called Pułazie in Podlaskie. Notable people with the name include:
 Deborah Polaski (1949), American opera and concert singer
 Frank Polaski (1904–1996), American politician

References

See also 
 Podlaski (disambiguation)
 Pulaski (disambiguation)

Polish-language surnames
Polish toponymic surnames